Cluster of Four Cubes is a 1992 kinetic stainless steel sculpture by George Rickey, installed at the National Gallery of Art Sculpture Garden in Washington, D.C., United States.

There is also a sculpture installed at St. Lawrence University in Canton, New York.

See also

 1992 in art
 List of public art in Washington, D.C., Ward 2

References

1992 sculptures
Abstract sculptures in Washington, D.C.
Collections of the National Gallery of Art
Kinetic sculptures in the United States
National Gallery of Art Sculpture Garden
Outdoor sculptures in Washington, D.C.
Stainless steel sculptures in the United States
Steel sculptures in Washington, D.C.
Outdoor sculptures in New York (state)
St. Lawrence University